Conrad J. Weittenhiller (September 27, 1855 – November 7, 1927) was an American businessman, farmer, politician.

Personal life
Born in Platteville, Wisconsin, Weittenhiller went to public school and to Platteville Normal School. He worked as a cooper and was a farmer. He was also involved with the creamery cooperative and the mining business. Weittenhiller died in his home, in Platteville, Wisconsin, from a fall.

Political career
Wettemhiller served on the Grant County, Wisconsin, Board of Supervisors and on the school board. In 1921, Weittenhiller served in the Wisconsin State Assembly and was a Republican. During his time in office, he introduced a bill seeking to make out-of-state marriages subject to registration and the Wisconsin eugenics law.

Notes

External links

1855 births
1927 deaths
People from Platteville, Wisconsin
University of Wisconsin–Platteville alumni
Businesspeople from Wisconsin
Farmers from Wisconsin
County supervisors in Wisconsin
School board members in Wisconsin
Republican Party members of the Wisconsin State Assembly
Accidental deaths in Wisconsin